Agnieszka Ewa Czopek-Sadowska (born 1964 in Krzeszowice) is a Polish backstroke, butterfly and medley swimmer and Olympic medalist. She competed at the 1980 Summer Olympics in Moscow, winning a bronze medal in 400 metre individual medley.

References

1964 births
Living people
Polish female backstroke swimmers
Polish female butterfly swimmers
Olympic swimmers of Poland
Olympic bronze medalists for Poland
Swimmers at the 1980 Summer Olympics
Olympic bronze medalists in swimming
People from Kraków County
European Aquatics Championships medalists in swimming
Polish female medley swimmers
Sportspeople from Lesser Poland Voivodeship
Medalists at the 1980 Summer Olympics
20th-century Polish women
21st-century Polish women